This is a list of plains on Mars. Such features are named after the nearest classical albedo feature in compliance with the International Astronomical Union's rules of planetary nomenclature. Plains may be named denoted "planitia" or "planum", depending on height.

Planitia

Planitia (plural: planitiae) is Latin for plain. It is the IAU descriptor term for features which are "low plains".

Plana

Planum (plural: plana) is the Latin word for plateau. It is the IAU descriptor term for plateaus and high plains.

Interactive Mars map

References

This article was based on the USGS's Gazetteer of Planetary Nomenclature.
  — current list of planitiae on Mars
  — current list of plana on Mars

External links